USS LST-472 was a United States Navy  used in the Asiatic-Pacific Theater during World War II. As with many of her class, the ship was never named. Instead, she was referred to by her hull designation.

Construction
LST-472 was laid down on 31 October 1942, under United States Maritime Commission (MARCOM) contract, MC hull 992, by Kaiser Shipyards, Vancouver, Washington; launched 7 December 1942; sponsored by Mrs. Frank C. Huntoon; and commissioned on 13 March 1943.

Service history 
During World War II, LST-472 was assigned to the Asiatic-Pacific theater and participated in the following operations: the consolidation of the southern Solomons in June 1943; the New Georgia Campaign, the New Georgia-Rendova-Vangunu occupation in July 1943; the Treasury-Bougainville operation, the Occupation and defense of Cape Torokina in November and December 1943; the Bismarck Archipelago operations, the Green Island landing in February 1944; the Hollandia operation in April 1944; Western New Guinea operations, the Toem-Wakde-Sarmi area operation in May 1944, the Biak Islands operation in June 1944, the Noemfoor Island operation in July 1944, the Cape Sansapor operation in August 1944, and the Morotai landing in September 1944; and the Luzon operation, the Mindoro landings in December 1944.

LST-472 was sunk during action with the enemy off Mindoro Island, Philippines, on 21 December 1944, and struck from the Navy list on 19 January 1945.

The wreck is located at

Honors and awards
LST-472 earned six battle stars and the Navy Unit Commendation for World War II service.

See also 
 List of United States Navy LSTs
 List of United States Navy losses in World War II

Notes 

Citations

Bibliography 

Online resources

External links

World War II shipwrecks in the Pacific Ocean
Ships sunk by kamikaze attack
World War II amphibious warfare vessels of the United States
Ships built in Vancouver, Washington
1942 ships
LST-1-class tank landing ships of the United States Navy
Maritime incidents in December 1944
S3-M2-K2 ships
Shipwrecks of the Philippines